The 2009 Pan-Pacific Championship was the second edition of the Pan-Pacific Championship. It was held in February 2009 in Carson, California, United States and featured the champions from the Chinese Super League and K-League, J. League Cup winners, and the hosts, Los Angeles Galaxy of Major League Soccer.

The Galaxy faced the Japanese representative, Oita Trinita, in the semi-final stage for the second successive year after facing Gamba Osaka in the 2008 competition, and this time they won the match. In the other semi-final, Korean side Suwon Samsung Bluewings beat Shandong Luneng Taishan of China.

Oita Trinita beat Shandong Luneng 2–1 to finish third in the tournament and Suwon Bluewings won the trophy after a 4–2 penalty shootout win over the Galaxy.

Teams
 Los Angeles Galaxy (host)
 Oita Trinita (2008 J. League Cup winners)
 Shandong Luneng Taishan (2008 Chinese Super League champions)
 Suwon Samsung Bluewings (2008 K-League & 2008 Hauzen Cup champions)

Bracket

Semifinals

Third-place match

Final

Scorers

Sponsors
The following is a list of the official sponsors of the Pan-Pacific Championship 2009.

Yamazaki-Nabisco
Japan Airlines
Sports DEPO

See also
2012 Hawaiian Islands Invitational

References

External links
Official website 

Pan-Pacific Championship
2009
Soccer in California
Pan-Pacific Championship
Pan
Sports competitions in Carson, California
2009 in sports in California